Carlos Augusto "Guto" Inocente Filho (born May 29, 1986) is a Brazilian professional mixed martial artist and kickboxer currently signed to ONE Championship. A professional MMA competitor since 2005, Inocente formerly competed for the UFC and Strikeforce in MMA.

He signed with Glory Kickboxing in 2016, eventually becoming a contender. In 2017, Inocente was banned for 4 years by the World Association of Kickboxing Organizations after he tested positive for four banned substances from the 2017 World Games.

He is ranked as the sixth best heavyweight by Combat Press as of September 2022, and eighth best by Beyond Kick as of October 2022. Combat Press previously ranked him as the #10 heavyweight in the world between July and August 2021.

Background 
Originally from Brasília, Brazil, Inocente first began training in striking at the age of four, coached by his father, and then began training in Brazilian jiu-jitsu at the age of seven. Inocente would go on to have accomplished careers in professional boxing and kickboxing, winning various titles; Inocente is a former five-time Brazilian Kickboxing Champion, a three-time Pan-American Champion, and a three-time South American Champion, among other titles.

Mixed martial arts career

Early career
Inocente made his professional MMA debut in 2005 and fought seven bouts in five years, two of them being for Shooto. There he defeated Vitor Miranda and one month later Gustavo Moia, to become the Shooto South American Heavyweight (220 lb) Champion. In 2011, with a record of 5-2, Inocente signed with Strikeforce.

Strikeforce
Inocente was expected to face Lionel Lanham on July 22, 2011, at Strikeforce Challengers: Bowling vs. Voelker. However, he was forced out of the bout due to injury and was replaced by T. J. Cook.

Inocente made his debut on January 7, 2012, at Strikeforce: Rockhold vs. Jardine against Virgil Zwicker. He defeated Zwicker via unanimous decision (29–28, 29–28, 30–27).

Inocente was expected to face Gian Villante on September 29, 2012, at Strikeforce: Melendez vs. Healy, but Showtime canceled the entire card due to Gilbert Melendez suffering an injury.

Ultimate Fighting Championship
After the demise of Strikeforce, Inocente signed with the UFC.

Inocente was expected to face Shane del Rosario in a Heavyweight bout on December 28, 2013 at UFC 168.  However, both participants pulled out of the bout citing injuries. Inocente's knee injury was exacerbated when he was re-injured by Alistair Overeem during training; a move that resulted in Overeem being asked to leave the Blackzillians. Reportedly, Inocente was sparring with Overeem and, despite having a broken hand, was getting the better of the exchanges until Overeem took Inocente down, causing the injury to Inocente's knee.

After over two years away from active competition due to injuries, Inocente made his UFC debut at The Ultimate Fighter 19 Finale on July 6, 2014 against Derrick Lewis. He lost the fight via KO in the first round.

Inocente then dropped to Light Heavyweight and faced Australian Anthony Perosh at UFC Fight Night 55 on 8 November 2014. He lost the fight via submission in the first round and later dismissed from the promotion.

Post-UFC career
After the release from UFC, Inocente fought Cristiano Bob at Capital Fight 5 on June 11, 2015. He won the fight via technical knockout. After the win, Inocente would go on to concentrate on his kickboxing career for a few years.

In late 2019, news surfaced that Inocente had applied to Brave CF openweight tournament lottery and was eventually picked to be a part of the tournament. He lost in the semifinals to Azamat Murzakanov on November 15, 2019.

On July 28, 2020, it was announced that Inocente had signed a contract with Taura MMA. He is expected to make his promotional debut against DJ Linderman at Taura MMA 11 on October 30, 2020.

Despite having signed a fight contract with Taura, Inocente fought Flavio Magon at Federal Fight 2 on September 5, 2020 in his native Brazil. He won the fight and claimed the vacant Federal Fight Heavyweight Championship via first-round knockout.

Inocente made his KSW debut against the former KSW Heavyweight title challenger Michał Andryszak at KSW 58: Kołecki vs. Zawada. Andryszak won the fight by an arm-triangle choke in the second round.

Inocente won his next two bouts on May 27 and July 29, 2021 at Nação Cyborg 8 and 9 against Lucas Henrique Monteiro and Alison Vicente via first round stoppages. In the second bout, Inocente would also win the NC Heavyweight Championship.

Kickboxing career

Glory
Inocente's debut with Glory came in February 2016, when he faced Demoreo Dennis. Inocente knocked Dennis out with a spinning hook kick in just 40 seconds. The finish won Glory's 2016 "Knockout of the Year" award.

Returning briefly to WGP, Inocente defended his Super Heavyweight title for the first time against Lucas Alsina. He beat Alsina by a fourth round TKO, due to low kicks.

His second Glory fight was against Brian Douwes, a fight which Inocente won by a unanimous decision.

He was scheduled to fight Hesdy Gerges during Glory 33. Inocente won the fight by a split decision.

Inocente beat D'Angelo Marshall during Glory 37, by an extra round decision.

He scored controversial decision upset of Benjamin Adegbuyi in the main event of Glory 43: New York, after appearing to lose two of the three rounds they had fought. The result was met with boos from the crowd, venting fury on Twitter shortly afterwards.

Guto took part in the 2018 Heavyweight Contender Tournament. Despite winning the semifinal bout against Junior Tafa, he was unable to advance to the finals due to a cut.

He was scheduled to fight Rico Verhoeven for the Glory Heavyweight title during Glory 59. Rico won the fight by a unanimous decision.

Inocente took part in the Glory 62 eight man heavyweight tournament. After winning a decision against Mohamed Abdallah in the quarter finals, he lost a decision in turn to Jamal Ben Saddik in the semifinals.

Guto defended the WGP title for a second time in June 2019, against Françesco Xhaja. Xhaja lost the fight by a unanimous decision.

Inocente defended the WGP Super Heavyweight title, during WGP 59, against Haime Morais. Inocente won the fight by a unanimous decision.

Doping suspension
In 2017, it was announced that Inocente was stripped of World Games gold after testing positive for four banned substances, including stanozolol, anastrozole, tamoxifen and THC. The Brazilian did not request a hearing and accepted the result, being banned by the World Association of Kickboxing Organizations (WAKO) until July 26, 2021.

ONE Championship
On May 20, 2020, it was reported that Inocente had signed with ONE Championship. Inocente is reportedly scheduled to make his ONE debut at ONE: Full Circle on February 25, 2022 against Bruno Susano. He defeated Susano by second-round technical knockout.

Inocente was scheduled to face Rade Opačić at ONE 157 on May 20, 2022. The bout was later postponed, as Inocente tested positive for COVID-19, and was rescheduled for ONE 158 on June 3, 2022. He won the bout via KO stoppage due to a liver punch in the first round.

ONE Kickboxing Heavyweight Grand Prix
Inocente faced the reigning ONE Light Heavyweight Kickboxing World Champion Roman Kryklia in the semifinals of the ONE Kickboxing Heavyweight Grand Prix at ONE 161 on September 29, 2022. He lost the fight by a first-round knockout.

Championships and accomplishments

Mixed martial arts
Nação Cyborg
2021 Nação Cyborg Heavyweight Champion (One time, current) 

Shooto 
Shooto South American 220 lb Champion (One time)

Win Fight and Entertainment 
WFE Light Heavyweight Champion (One time)

Kickboxing
WGP Kickboxing
2019 WGP Kickboxing Super Heavyweight (+94 kg) Champion 
2016 WGP Kickboxing world Super Heavyweight championship;
2015 WGP Kickboxing world Light Heavyweight championship;

World Association of Kickboxing Organizations 
2010 W.A.K.O. Pan American Championship in Guarujá, Brazil  (K-1 rules +91 kg)
2010 20th W.A.K.O. Brazilian Championships in Rio de Janeiro, Brazil  (K-1 rules +91 kg)
2009 W.A.K.O. South American Championship in Asunción, Paraguay  (K-1 rules +91 kg)
2009 W.A.K.O. World Championship in Villach, Austria  (K-1 rules +91 kg)
2008 and 2009 W.A.K.O. Brazilian Championships in São Paulo, Brazil  (K-1 rules +91 kg)
2008 W.A.K.O. Pan American Championship in Viña del Mar, Chile  (K-1 rules +91 kg)
2007 W.A.K.O. South American Championship in São Paulo, Brazil  (K-1 rules +91 kg)
2006 W.A.K.O. Pan American Championship in Niterói, Brazil  (K-1 rules +91 kg)

Awards
Liverkick.com
 2016 Knockout of the Year (vs. Demoreo Dennis)

Kickboxing record (Incomplete) 

|- style="background:#fbb;"
| 2022-09-29 || Loss || align="left" | Roman Kryklia || ONE 161|| Kallang, Singapore || TKO (Head Kick) || 1 || 0:52
|-
! style=background:white colspan=9 |
|- style="background:#cfc;"
| 2022-06-03 || Win || align="left" | Rade Opačić || ONE 158 || Kallang, Singapore || KO (Body punch) || 1 || 2:33
|- style="background:#cfc;"
| 2022-02-25 || Win ||align=left| Bruno Susano || ONE: Full Circle || Kallang, Singapore ||  TKO (Referee Stoppage/Punches) || 2 || 2:22 
|- style="background:#cfc;"
| 2019-11-09 || Win||align=left| Haime Morais || WGP Kickboxing #59 || Brasilia, Brazil || Decision (Unanimous) || 5 ||  3:00 
|- 
! style=background:white colspan=9 |
|- style="background:#cfc;"
| 2019-06-15 || Win||align=left| Françesko Xhaja  || WGP Kickboxing #55 || Brasilia, Brazil || Decision (Unanimous) || 5 ||  3:00 
|- 
! style=background:white colspan=9 |
|- style="background:#fbb;"
| 2018-12-08 || Loss||align=left| Jamal Ben Saddik || Glory 62: Rotterdam, Semi Finals || Rotterdam, Netherlands || Decision (Unanimous) || 3 ||  3:00
|-
|- style="background:#cfc;"
| 2018-12-08 || Win||align=left| Mohamed Abdallah  || Glory 62: Rotterdam, Quarter Finals || Rotterdam, Netherlands || Decision (4-1) || 3 ||  3:00 
|-
|- style="background:#fbb;"
| 2018-09-29 || Loss ||align=left| Rico Verhoeven || Glory 59: Amsterdam || Amsterdam, Netherlands || Decision (unanimous) || 5 || 3:00
|-
! style="background:white" colspan=9 |
|-
|-  style="background:#cfc;"
| 2018-02-16 || Win ||align=left| Junior Tafa || Glory 50: Chicago - Heavyweight Contender Tournament, Semi Finals || Chicago, US || Decision (unanimous) || 3 || 3:00
|-
|-  style="background:#cfc;"
| 2017-07-14 || Win ||align=left| Benjamin Adegbuyi || Glory 43: New York || New York City, New York, US || Decision (split) || 3 || 3:00
|-
|-  style="background:#fbb;"
| 2017-03-25 || Loss ||align=left| Jamal Ben Saddik || Glory 39: Brussels || Brussels, Belgium || Decision (Unanimous) || 3 ||  3:00
|-
|-  style="background:#cfc;"
| 2017-01-20 || Win ||align=left| D'Angelo Marshall || Glory 37: Los Angeles || Los Angeles, California, US || Ext. R. Decision (Unanimous) || 4 || 3:00
|-
|-  style="background:#cfc;"
| 2016-09-09 || Win ||align=left| Hesdy Gerges|| Glory 33: New Jersey|| Trenton, New Jersey || Decision (split) || 3 || 3:00
|-
|-  style="background:#cfc;"
| 2016-05-13 || Win ||align=left| Brian Douwes|| Glory 30: Los Angeles|| Ontario, California || Decision (unanimous) || 3 || 3:00
|-
|-  style="background:#cfc;"
| 2016-04-09 || Win ||align=left| Lucas Alsina|| WGP Kickboxing 29 || Paraná, Brasil || KO (Low kicks) || 4 || 1:30
|-
! style=background:white colspan=9 |
|-  style="background:#cfc;"
|-  style="background:#cfc;"
| 2016-02-26 || Win ||align=left| Demoreo Dennis || Glory 27: Chicago || Hoffman Estates, Illinois, US || KO (Spinning Hook Kick) || 1 || 0:40
|-  style="background:#cfc;"
| 2015-09-05 || Win ||align=left| Felipe Micheletti || WGP Kickboxing 26 || Guarapuava, Brazil || Decision (Unanimous) || 5 || 3:00
|-
! style=background:white colspan=9 |
|-  style="background:#fbb;"
| 2007-11-10 || Loss ||align=left| Anderson Silva || Demolition Fight 6 || São Paulo, Brazil || Decision (Unanimous) || 3 || 3:00
|-
! style=background:white colspan=9 |
|-

|-  
|-  style="background:#fbb;"
| 2009-10 || Loss ||align=left| Alexey Kudin || W.A.K.O World Championships 2009, K-1 Final + 91 kg kg || Villach, Austria ||  ||  ||
|-
! style=background:white colspan=9 |
|-
|-  style="background:#cfc;"
| 2009-10 || Win ||align=left| Tihamer Brunner || W.A.K.O World Championships 2009, K-1 Semi Finals + 91 kg kg || Villach, Austria ||  ||  ||
|-
|-  style="background:#fbb;"
| 2007-09-? || Loss ||align=left| Mirko Vlahovic || W.A.K.O World Championships 2007, K-1 Rules Quarter Finals +91 kg || Belgrade, Serbia || || ||
|-
|-  style="background:#cfc;"
| 2007-09-? || Win ||align=left| Leonardo Komsic || W.A.K.O World Championships 2007, K-1 Rules 1st Round +91 kg || Belgrade, Serbia || || ||
|-
|-
| colspan=9 | Legend:

Mixed martial arts record

|-
|Win
|align=center|10–6
|Alison Vicente
| TKO (punches)
| Nação Cyborg 9
|
|align=center|1
|align=center|3:45
|Paraná, Brazil
|
|-
|Win
|align=center|9–6
|Lucas Henrique Monteiro
| TKO (punches)
| Nação Cyborg 8
|
|align=center|1
|align=center|3:18
|Piraquara, Brazil
|
|-
|Loss
|align=center|8–6
| Michał Andryszak
| Submission (arm-triangle choke)
| KSW 58
|
|align=center|2
|align=center|4:06
|Łódź, Poland
|
|-
|Win
|align=center|8–5
|Flavio Magon
|KO (punch)
|Federal Fight 2
|
|align=center|1
|align=center|3:52
|Taguatinga, Brazil
|
|-
|Loss
|align=center|7–5
|Azamat Murzakanov
|Decision (unanimous)
|Brave CF 29
|
|align=center|3
|align=center|5:00
|Bahrain
|Openweight bout.
|-
|Win
|align=center|7–4
|Cristiano Bob
|TKO (head kick and punches)
|Capital Fight 5
|
|align=center|2
|align=center|2:05
|Brasília, Brazil
|
|-
|Loss
|align=center|6–4
|Anthony Perosh
|Submission (rear-naked choke)
|UFC Fight Night: Rockhold vs. Bisping
|
|align=center|1
|align=center|3:46
|Sydney, Australia
|
|-
|Loss
|align=center|6–3
|Derrick Lewis
|KO (punches)
|The Ultimate Fighter: Team Edgar vs. Team Penn Finale
|
|align=center|1
|align=center|3:30
|Las Vegas, Nevada, United States
|
|-
|Win
|align=center|6–2
|Virgil Zwicker
|Decision (unanimous)
|Strikeforce: Barnett vs. Cormier
|
|align=center|3
|align=center|5:00
|San Jose, California, United States
|
|-
|Win
|align=center|5–2
|Gustavo Moia
|KO (knee)
|Shooto Brazil 18
|
|align=center|1
|align=center|0:40
|Brasília, Brazil
|Won Shooto South-American Heavyweight (220 lb) Championship.
|-
|Win
|align=center|4–2
|Kléber Raimundo Silva
|TKO (shoulder injury)
|Win Fight and Entertainment 7
|
|align=center|2
|align=center|N/A
|Salvador, Brazil
|Won WFE Light Heavyweight Championship.
|-
|Win
|align=center|3–2
|Vitor Miranda
|Submission (punches)
|Shooto Brazil 17
|
|align=center|2
|align=center|1:43
|Rio de Janeiro, Brazil
|
|-
|Loss
|align=center|2–2
|Ismael de Jesus
|Decision (unanimous)
|Goiânia Open Fight 2
|
|align=center|3
|align=center|5:00
|Goiânia, Brazil
|
|-
|Win
|align=center|2–1
|Junior Beba
|Submission (triangle choke)
|Paraúna Fight
|
|align=center|1
|align=center|2:30
|Paraúna, Brazil
|
|-
|Win
|align=center|1–1
|Diego Nunes
|Submission (armbar)
|Extreme Fight Brasilia
|
|align=center|1
|align=center|N/A
|Brasília, Brazil
|
|-
|Loss
|align=center|0–1
|Leandro Silva
|Decision (unanimous)
|Goiânia Open Fight 1
|
|align=center|3
|align=center|5:00
|Goiânia, Brazil
|
|-

See also
 List of male kickboxers
 List of male mixed martial artists

References

External links 
 Official Glory profile
 
 

1986 births
Living people
Brazilian male mixed martial artists
Light heavyweight mixed martial artists
Mixed martial artists utilizing boxing
Mixed martial artists utilizing Brazilian jiu-jitsu
Brazilian male kickboxers
Glory kickboxers
ONE Championship kickboxers 
Brazilian practitioners of Brazilian jiu-jitsu
People awarded a black belt in Brazilian jiu-jitsu
Sportspeople from Brasília  
Doping cases in kickboxing
Ultimate Fighting Championship male fighters